Carl Johan Alexander von Wendt (born 7 March 1953) is a Swedish curler.

Teams

References

External links
 

Living people
1953 births
Swedish male curlers
Swedish curling champions